Tolecusatellitidae is a family of biological satellites that is not assigned to any higher taxonomic ranks. The family contains two genera and 131 species. This family of viruses depend on the presence of another virus (helper viruses) to replicate their genomes, as such they have minimal genomes with very low genomic redundancy.

Genera
The family consists of the following two genera:

 Betasatellite – 119 species
 Deltasatellite – 12 species

References 

Virus families